Mindanao is a 2019 Philippine war drama film directed by Brillante Mendoza starring Judy Ann Santos and Allen Dizon. It was selected as the Philippine entry for the Best International Feature Film at the 93rd Academy Awards, but it was not nominated. As of 2022, this was the last film submitted after the Film Academy of the Philippines controversially chose not to send any entry as they lacked government funding due to the COVID-19 pandemic.

Cast
Judy Ann Santos as Saima Datupalo; A Muslim mother who cares for her daughter afflicted with cancer. This is Santos' first film with director Brillante Mendoza and her first Metro Manila Film Festival film since 2012 where she starred in Si Agimat, si Enteng at si Ako with Bong Revilla and Vic Sotto. Among the challenges Santos dealt with in portraying her role is the fact that she had to often carry a 7-year-old child and taking into account cultural sensitivities to be able to portray as Muslim character in a respectful manner such as on how they dress and converse with other people. Santos accepted the role after she was approached by Mendoza despite having no script yet for the film at the time the offer was made.
Allen Dizon as Malang Datupalo; A combat medic in the Philippine Army deployed to fight rebel forces in Mindanao and the husband of Saima. Dizon's character is characterized as a Maguindanaoan Muslim man by director Mendoza to prove a point that religion and personal belief is irrelevant to one's "love for country".
Yuna Tangog as Aisa Datupalo; the 6-year-old child actress portrays Aisa, the cancer-stricken daughter of Malang and Saima Datupalo being taken care of in the House of Hope, a temporary shelter for children affected by cancer in Davao City, by her mother.

Synopsis
Saima (Judy Ann Santos) cares for her cancer-stricken daughter Aisa (Yuna Tangog) while she awaits her husband Malang (Allen Dizon) to come home who serves as a combat medic deployed in the southern Philippines. Their struggle is juxtaposed with the folklore of Rajah Indara Patra and Rajah Sulayman, the sons of Sultan Nabi, who fights to stop a dragon devastating Lanao.

Production
Mindanao was produced under Center Stage Production and was directed by Brillante Mendoza. It was produced by Mendoza and Carlo Valenzona. Diego Marx Dobles was responsible for the editing, Odyssey Flores for the cinematography while Teresa Barrozo provided direction for the film's music. Mendoza himself also was behind the film's production design.

Prior to making the film director Brillante Mendoza researched about Mindanao. Since the film involved the Maguindanaon folklore of Rajah Indara Patra and Rajah Sulayman the film was initially known under the working title of Maguindanao but the title of the film was changed to Mindanao since the film's theme was deemed by Mendoza to be "bigger than Maguindanao". However he conceded that the issues affecting Mindanao is complex and the film's inability to fully present these issues to an audience.

Marketing
Prior to the film's Busan release a music video featuring the film's theme song "Itadyak" by Maan Chua was released. It featured colorful dances and select scenic locations from the film.
Solar Pictures released the theatrical release poster for Mindanao in the Philippines on November 16, 2019.

Release
Mindanao was first released outside the Philippines at the 2019 Busan International Film Festival on October 5, 2019, as part of the Icons category. It was also exhibited at the Tokyo on October 30, 2019. The film was also screened in film festivals in Egypt, Estonia, India, and Taiwan. The film premiered in Philippine cinemas on December 25, 2019, as entry of the 2019 Metro Manila Film Festival. Due to its critical success in the film festival's awarding night, the film organizers decided to sponsor the film's screening in future film festivals.

Reception

Accolades

See also
 List of submissions to the 93rd Academy Awards for Best International Feature Film
 List of Philippine submissions for the Academy Award for Best International Feature Film

References

External links
 

2019 films
2019 drama films
2019 war drama films
2010s war drama films
Films with live action and animation
Philippine drama films
Philippine war drama films
Films about rebellions in the Philippines
Films set in Mindanao
Films about cancer